Branden Wayne Joseph is the Frank Gallipoli Professor of Modern and Contemporary Art in the department of Art History and Archaeology at Columbia University. Prior to coming to Columbia in the fall of 2006, Joseph taught at the University of California, Irvine. He is the author of Random Order: Robert Rauschenberg and the Neo-Avant-Garde, contributing author to Anthony McCall: The Solid Light Films and Related Works and an editor of the journal Grey Room, a multi-disciplinary journal of architecture, art, media and politics. He has published books about Robert Rauschenberg, Andy Warhol, John Cage, Diane Arbus, Buckminster Fuller, Robert Morris, Pat O'Neill, and Anthony McCall. He has a Ph.D. from Harvard University.

Awards
Coca-Cola Berlin Prize from The American Academy of Berlin
Paul Mellon Visiting Senior Fellow, Center for Advanced Study in the Visual Arts, 2019.

Publications
Joseph, Branden Wayne. Anthony McCall: the solid light films and related works, with texts by Branden W. Joseph and Jonathan Walley; edited by Christopher Eamon. Evanston, IL : Northwestern University Press  San Francisco, CA: New Art Trust, 2005. 172 p.: ill. (some col.) ; 29 cm. 
Joseph, Branden Wayne. Random order: Robert Rauschenberg and the neo-avant-garde, Branden W. Joseph. Cambridge, Massachusetts: MIT Press, c2003. xiii, 418 p.: ill.; 24 cm. 
 Robert Rauschenberg, edited by Branden W. Joseph; essays by Leo Steinberg ... [et al.]. Cambridge, Massachusetts: MIT Press, c2002. 163 p. : ill. ; 24 cm.

References

External links
Branden W. Joseph faculty page at Columbia University
Branden W. Joseph page at MIT Press
Branden W. Joseph page at FindArticles.com
 InterActivist Info Exchange: Branden W. Joseph, "Interview with Paolo Virno"

American art historians
Columbia University faculty
University of California, Irvine faculty
Living people
Harvard University alumni
Year of birth missing (living people)
21st-century American historians
21st-century American male writers
American male non-fiction writers